Mussarat Ahmed Zeb is a Pakistani politician who had been a member of the National Assembly of Pakistan, from June 2013 to May 2018. She is the widowed wife of Miangul Ahmed Zeb, son of the Wāli of Swat Miangul Jahan Zeb.

Political career

She was elected to the National Assembly of Pakistan as a candidate of Pakistan Tehreek-e-Insaf (PTI) on a reserved seat for women from Khyber Pakhtunkhwa in 2013 Pakistani general election.

In 2014, PTI cancelled her membership and asked for her disqualification from the membership of National Assembly.

In May 2018, she quit PTI and in September 2021, she joined the Awami National Party.

References

Pakistan Tehreek-e-Insaf politicians
People from Swat District
Pakistani MNAs 2013–2018
Living people
Women members of the National Assembly of Pakistan
Year of birth missing (living people)
21st-century Pakistani women politicians